Hagelseeli or Hagelseewli is a lake in the Canton of Berne, Switzerland.

Lakes of Switzerland
Bernese Oberland
Lakes of the canton of Bern